Primal Buddika (born 24 March 1979) is a Sri Lankan former cricketer. He played in 85 first-class and 64 List A matches between 1998/99 and 2012/13. He made his Twenty20 debut on 17 August 2004, for Galle Cricket Club in the 2004 SLC Twenty20 Tournament.

References

External links
 

1979 births
Living people
Sri Lankan cricketers
Galle Cricket Club cricketers
Place of birth missing (living people)